Titi Parizad (also Romanized as Tītī Parīzād; also known as Tītī Parīzādeh) is a village in Shirju Posht Rural District, Rudboneh District, Lahijan County, Gilan Province, Iran. At the 2006 census, its population was 78, in 25 families.

References 

Populated places in Lahijan County